Rockwells Mills Historic District is a national historic district located at Guilford in Chenango County, New York. The district includes 26 contributing buildings including approximately 20 houses with associated houses and a stone textile mill.  Included is the large Italianate style Crandall Residence (1867–1868), historically the mill owners house, and the stone mill building.  The other residences are disbursed along New York State Route 8.  In 1947, the mill was converted for use as a restaurant.

It was added to the National Register of Historic Places in 2010.

References

Historic districts on the National Register of Historic Places in New York (state)
Historic districts in Chenango County, New York
National Register of Historic Places in Chenango County, New York